Georges Soulès (11 November 1907 – 26 August 1986), known by his pen name Raymond Abellio, was a French writer.

Life
Abellio went to the École Polytechnique and then took part in the X-Crise Group. He advocated far-left ideas, but like many other technocrats, he joined the Vichy regime during the Second World War and became in 1942 secretary general of Eugène Deloncle's far-right Mouvement Social Révolutionnaire (MSR) party. He then participated in Marcel Déat's attempt of creating a unified Collaborationist party. In April and September 1943 he participated in the Days of the Mont-Dore, an assembly of collaborationist personalities under the patronage of Philippe Pétain. After the Liberation, he was sentenced to 20 years imprisonment in absentia for Collaborationism, and escaped to Switzerland. However, he was pardoned in 1952 and went on to start a literary career.

Besides his literary career, under the influence of Pierre de Combas, he developed an interest in esoterism, and especially astrology.  He was also interested in the possibility of a secret numerical code in the Bible, a subject that he developed in La Bible, document chiffré in 1950, and later in Introduction à une théorie des nombres bibliques, in 1984. He proposed in particular that the number of the beast, 666, was the key number of life, a manifestation of the holy trinity on all possible levels, material, animist and spiritual. He has also written on the philosophy of rugby football.

Beginning in 1974 he edited the Recherches avancées book series for Fayard.

Works 

 with André Mahé La Fin du nihilisme - 1943 (signed under his actual name, Georges Soulès)
Heureux les pacifiques - 1946
Les yeux d'Ézéchiel sont ouverts - 1949
 Vers un nouveau prophétisme : essai sur le rôle politique du sacré et la situation de Lucifer dans le monde moderne - 1950
 La Bible, document chiffré : essai sur la restitution des clefs de la science numérale secrète. Tome 1. Clefs générales - 1950
 La Bible, document chiffré : essai sur la restitution des clefs de la science numérale secrète. Tome 2. Les Séphiroth et les 5 premiers versets de la Genèse - 1950
 Assomption de l'Europe -1954
 with Paul Sérant Au seuil de l'ésotérisme : précédé de : l'Esprit moderne et la tradition - 1955
La fosse de Babel - 1962
 La Structure absolue - 1965
 Hommages à Robert Brasillach - 1965
 Guénon, oui. Mais... in Planète n°15, April 1970
 La Fin de l'Ésotérisme - 1973
Sol Invictus - 1981 (winner of the Prix des Deux-Magots)
 Montségur - 1982
 Visages immobiles - 1983
 Introduction à une théorie des nombres bibliques - 1984
 Manifeste de la nouvelle Gnose - 1989 (edited by Marie-Thérèse de Brosses and Charles Hirsch)
 Fondements d'éthique - 1994

References

1907 births
1986 deaths
Writers from Toulouse
20th-century French non-fiction writers
20th-century French male writers
French collaborators with Nazi Germany
French Army personnel of World War II
Recipients of French presidential pardons
French astrologers
20th-century astrologers
French fascists
French occultists
Prix des Deux Magots winners
Prix Sainte-Beuve winners
20th-century occultists
French prisoners of war in World War II
World War II prisoners of war held by Germany